Danny Halsey (born 15 September 1988) is a former motorcycle speedway from England.

Speedway career
He rode in the top tier of British Speedway riding for the Eastbourne Eagles during the 2014 Elite League speedway season. He started his speedway career in England riding for the junior team at Rye House Rockets in 2005.

During the 2014 National League speedway season he won the National League Riders' Championship, when with the Mildenhall Fen Tigers.

References 

1988 births
Living people
British speedway riders
Cradley Heathens riders
Eastbourne Eagles riders
Mildenhall Fen Tigers riders
Rye House Rockets riders